The Nighthawks are an American blues and roots music band, based in Washington, D.C.  As of 2018, The Nighthawks are Mark Wenner (vocals and harmonica), Dan Hovey (lead guitar), Paul Pisciotta (bass guitar), and Mark Stutso (drums).

History
Formed in 1972, the Nighthawks underwent several personnel changes before stabilizing as the lineup of Mark Wenner (vocals and harmonica), Jimmy Thackery (lead guitar), Jan Zukowski (bass guitar), and Pete Ragusa (drums). Their 1979 album, Full House, issued on Adelphi Records, includes guest appearances from Pinetop Perkins and Bob Margolin.

Keyboard player Gregg Wetzel joined the band in 1983, was a full-time member until 1986, and has continued to play at special performances. The membership of the band remained stable until 1986.  At that time, tired of the band's extensive touring schedule, Thackery departed to join 'The Assassins' (a part-time "vacation band" he helped found), eventually fronting 'The Drivers' and other groups and to record for Blind Pig Records, and Telarc Records. Following his departure, several players filled the lead guitar spot. These included Jimmy Nalls, Warren Haynes, James Solberg, Danny Morris, Pete Kanaras, with Kanaras becoming the longest lasting member. Also in 1987 and 1988 the band became the Rosebud Agency's East Coast house band, backing tours with Elvin Bishop, John Lee Hooker, John Hammond, and Pinetop Perkins.

In 2003, the band featured in the first episode of the second season of The Wire.

Kanaras and Zukowski departed the band in 2004.  They were replaced by Paul Bell (lead guitar) and Johnny Castle (bass guitar). The Nighthawks won the Traditional Blues/R&B Duo/Group Award at the 2009 Washington Area Music Awards. In 2011, their album, Last Train to Bluesville won the Acoustic Album of the Year at the 32nd Blues Music Awards, sponsored by the Blues Foundation.

In 2011, they signed with Severn Records. Then the band released a number of albums on Richmond's EllerSoul label including a Reverend Billy C. Wirtz release.

In 2018 Johnny Castle and Paul Bell left the band to be replaced by Paul Pisciotta on bass and Dan Hovey on guitar. They recorded Tryin To Get To You at Severn Studio in Annapolis, MD with David Earl co-producing and engineering in 2019 and released it on EllerSoul, spring 2020 in time for national lockdown. They are currently back in Severn working on new product including four Dan Hovey originals and two Mark Stutso originals. Tentative title is 49/50 since the band will celebrate its 50th anniversary in 2022.

Discography

Other releases featuring the Nighthawks
 Hot Tracks – John Hammond and the Nighthawks (1979, Vanguard)
 Bad Boy "Live" – Oki and the Nighthawks (1984)
 Your Name Here – The Nighthawks Minus Mark (2014, Ellersoul) 
 Full Circle – Rev. Billy C. Wirtz and the Nighthawks (2016, EllerSoul) 
 Flying High – Gabe Stillman and the Nighthawks (2020)

Mark Wenner solo albums
 Fugitive – with "Switchblade" (1984, Whitewall)
 Nothin' But... – with "The Bel Airs" (1989, Powerhouse)
 Runs Good, Needs Paint (2000, Right On Rhythm)
 Mama Tried – with "The Bel Airs" (2002, Right On Rhythm)
 Mark Wenner's Blues Warriors (2018, EllerSoul)

See also
 WHFS

References

External links
 The Nighthawks official site

American blues musical groups
Musical groups from Washington, D.C.
Ruf Records artists
Mercury Records artists